José Gómez (14 September 1916 – 20 February 2005) was a Guatemalan sports shooter. He competed at the 1952 Summer Olympics, finishing 30th in Men's 50 metre rifle, prone, and 32nd in Men's 25 metre rapid fire pistol.

References

External links
 

1916 births
2005 deaths
Guatemalan male sport shooters
Olympic shooters of Guatemala
Shooters at the 1952 Summer Olympics